Cerro Arenales is a heavily ice-covered stratovolcano located in the Aysén del General Carlos Ibáñez del Campo Region of Chile, within Laguna San Rafael National Park. It towers over the southern part of the Northern Patagonian Ice Field. Arenales has a summit elevation of 3,437 meters (11276 feet) above sea level.

Climbing 
The first ascent of Cerro Arenales was made in 1958 by a Japanese-Chilean expedition, headed by Professor Tanaka. In December 1963 an expedition led by Eric Shipton, crossed the NPIF heading southeast from Laguna San Rafael to Río de la Colonia and accomplished on the way the second ascent.

See also
Monte San Valentín
Baker River
List of Ultras of South America

References

External links
 "Cerro Arenales, Chile" on Peakbagger

Volcanoes of Aysén Region
Active volcanoes
Andean Volcanic Belt
Stratovolcanoes of Chile
Mountains of Chile
Quaternary volcanoes
Quaternary South America
Three-thousanders of the Andes
Mountains of Aysén Region